Timothy George (born 9 January 1950) is an American theologian and journalist. He became the founding dean of Beeson Divinity School at the school's inception in 1988 and was the dean from 1989–2019, now serving as Research Professor of Divinity. George teaches church history and doctrine and serves as executive editor for Christianity Today. He is on the editorial advisory boards of the Harvard Theological Review, Christian History, and Books & Culture. He also serves as a fellow for The Center for Baptist Renewal.

Career
George has served on the Board of Directors of Lifeway Christian Resources of the Southern Baptist Convention. He has written more than 20 books and regularly contributes to scholarly journals. His book Theology of the Reformers has been translated into several languages and is used as a textbook in many schools and seminaries.

His most recent books are Is the Father of Jesus the God of Muhammad? and The Mark of Jesus: Loving in a Way the World Can See (with John Woodbridge).  He edited J.I. Packer and the Evangelical Future (Baker 2009) and co-edited the book Our Sufficiency is of God: Essays on Preaching in Honor of Gardner C. Taylor (March 2010).

George is active in evangelical–Roman Catholic Church dialogue.  He co-authored the Manhattan Declaration: A Call of Christian Conscience with Roman Catholic lawyer Robert P. George.

He is also an ordained minister and has been pastor of churches in Georgia, Alabama, and Massachusetts.

Personal life
He and his wife, Denise, have two adult children.

Education
 A.B., University of Tennessee at Chattanooga
 M.Div., Harvard Divinity School
 Th.D., Harvard University

Published works

Articles
Some of his articles are available online:
 How Old Are the Baptists?
 John Calvin: Comeback Kid
 We Travel Together Still: A Tribute to Father Richard John Neuhaus
 Lincoln's Faith and America's Future
 Rick 'n Jesus
 Bend It Like Beckwith?
 The Jerry I Remember
 Love in the Ruins: St. Augustine on 9/11
 Southern Baptists after the Revolution
 Delighted by Doctrine (A Tribute to Jaroslav Pelikan)
 The Word Became Flesh
 Is Jesus a Baptist?
 Where Are They Now? A Monthly Update on Beeson Alumni

Books
 Theology of the Reformers (Broadman Press, 1988)

References

External links
 

Living people
Samford University people
1950 births
American Christian theologians
Baptists from the United States
Harvard Divinity School alumni
Southern Baptist ministers
University of Tennessee at Chattanooga alumni
American university and college faculty deans